Secret Center was a revolutionary organization established in October 1906. Based in Tabriz, it played an important role in the Persian Constitutional Revolution. It had close ties to the Social Democratic Party.

References

Bibliography

Persian Constitutional Revolution
1906 establishments in Iran